McElroy Milne v Commercial Electronics Ltd [1993] 1 NZLR 39 is a cited case in New Zealand regarding remoteness of damages for the remedy of damages for breach of contract.

References

Court of Appeal of New Zealand cases
New Zealand contract case law
1993 in New Zealand law
1993 in case law